{{DISPLAYTITLE:C3H9N}}
The molecular formula C3H9N (molar mass: 59.11 g/mol) may refer to:

Ethylmethylamine, or N-methylethanamine
Isopropylamine
Propylamine
Trimethylamine (TMA)

Molecular formulas